Arthur Pimlott (1872 – January 1895) was a footballer who played as a forward for Burslem Port Vale between 1891 and 1893.

Career
Pimlott probably joined Burslem Port Vale sometime in 1891. He scored three goals in four Midland League games and three cup games in the 1891–92 season, and featured once in the Football League Second Division in the 1892–93 season. He left the Athletic Ground in 1893, two years before his death.

Career statistics
Source:

References

1872 births
1895 deaths
Sportspeople from Hanley, Staffordshire
English footballers
Association football forwards
Port Vale F.C. players
Midland Football League players
English Football League players